Juan Manuel Soriano (1920 – 10 October 1995) was a Spanish voice actor and his career spanned over 50 years including a radio program of Don Juan Tenorio. In radio, he dubbed American actors such as Clark Gable, Kirk Douglas and James Stewart. He created the Radio Nacional de España (RNE) radio program Teatro invisible. He also won a Premios Ondas for Best Actor in the RNE programs in 1957.

Filmography
 In a Corner of Spain (1949)
 Unas páginas en negro(1950)
 Érase una vez (1950)
 Facing the Sea (1951)
 Luna de sangre (1952)
 Hay un camino a la derecha (1953)
 Once pares de botas (1954)
 La pecadora (1956)
 The Legion of Silence (1956)
 El último verano (1962)
 ¿Quién tiene la palabra? (TV series) (1963)
 ¿Quién es quién? (TV series) (1963)
 Los Tarantos (1963)
 Tarjeta de visita (1964) 
 La sunamita (1965)
 Amor amor amor (1965)
 La fira de Santa Lluçia (1975)
 Som i serem'' (1981)

Bibliography
Enciclopèdia Espasa Suplement dels anys 1995-96, pàg. 159

References

External links
 

Spanish television presenters
Spanish male voice actors
Spanish male radio actors
1920 births
1995 deaths
20th-century Spanish male actors
People from Santa Cruz de Tenerife